National Housing Corporation may refer to:

 National Housing Corporation (Barbados)
 National Housing Corporation (Kenya)
 National Housing Corporation (Malaysia)
 National Housing Corporation (Tanzania)
 National Housing Corporation (Papua New Guinea)
 National Housing and Construction Company (Uganda)